Michael Henry Corgan (October 26, 1918 – May 28, 1989) was an American football player.

Born in Olongapo in the Philippines, Corgan attended Alma High School in Michigan, and played college football at Notre Dame from 1937 to 1939.

After graduating from Notre Dame, Corgan in 1940 was hired as a football coach at Roger Williams High School in St. Joseph, Michigan.

In 1943, Corgan resumed his playing career, playing professional football in the National Football League (NFL) as a fullback for the Detroit Lions. He appeared in four NFL games, one as a starter.

References

1918 births
1989 deaths
Notre Dame Fighting Irish football players
Detroit Lions players
People from Olongapo